North Bendigo is  a suburb of the city of Bendigo in central Victoria, Australia. At the 2011 census, North Bendigo had a population of 3,953.

History
A section of North Bendigo was formally known as "Emu Point" which had a large community of Chinese miners who built the Bendigo Joss house around 1865.

References

External links

Suburbs of Bendigo
Bendigo